The women's long jump event at the 1990 Commonwealth Games was held on 2 February at the Mount Smart Stadium in Auckland.

Results

Final

References

Long
1990
1990 in women's athletics